Juan del Castillo (died 1593) was a Roman Catholic prelate who served as Bishop of Santiago de Cuba (1564–1578).

Biography
Juan del Castillo was born in Quintanar de la Orden, Spain.
On 28 April 1564, Juan del Castillo was appointed during the papacy of Pope Pius IV as Bishop of Santiago de Cuba.
In June 1567, he was consecrated bishop. 
He served as Bishop of Santiago de Cuba until his resignation on 3 October 1578. 
He died in June 1593.

References

External links and additional sources
 (for Chronology of Bishops)  
 (for Chronology of Bishops) 

16th-century Roman Catholic bishops in Cuba
Bishops appointed by Pope Pius IV
1593 deaths
Roman Catholic bishops of Santiago de Cuba